Markos Mamalakis (Greek: Μάρκος Μαμαλάκης; born October 30, 1932) is a Greek economist specialising in development economics, particularly in Latin America.

Born in Salonika, he graduated from the Experimental High School of the Aristotle University of Thessaloniki in 1950, then attended the Law School of the University and received a B.A. in Law, with the distinction summa cum laude in 1955. He did graduate work at Ludwig Maximilian University of Munich from 1955 to 1957, and University of California, Berkeley from 1957 to 1962, where he received his M.A. (1959), and Ph.D. (1962) with a dissertation entitled Inflation and Growth: An Asset Preference Analysis. With a Case Study of the Chilean Inflation. He has taught or been a visiting scholar at the University of California, Berkeley; University of Western Ontario; Universidad de Chile; Yale; University of Göttingen; Woodrow Wilson International Center for Scholars; Inter-American Development Bank; and the University of Giessen.

He is a professor of economics at the University of Wisconsin–Milwaukee.

He was one of the first to argue that there is no "magic bullet" to development, but that development solutions must take into account the effects and circumstances of the location. He has published widely on macroeconomics in developing economies and welfare and sector effects.  He  argued for the fruitfulness of a mesoeconomic analysis of social interactions, rather than a strictly microeconomic or macroecomic approach.

Markos is a father of twelve and grandfather of thirty-seven. He and his wife celebrated their 50th wedding anniversary on January 31, 2010.

External links
 Dr. Mamalakis's faculty home page at University of Wisconsin–Milwaukee
 

1932 births
Living people
20th-century Greek economists
Writers from Thessaloniki
Development economists
Economics educators
University of Wisconsin–Milwaukee faculty
Ludwig Maximilian University of Munich alumni
University of California, Berkeley alumni
University of California, Berkeley faculty
21st-century Greek economists